Sciaky may refer to:

 Ed Sciaky (1948–2004), American disc jockey
 Sciaky, Inc., an American manufacturer of metal printing and welding systems